Daniel Patrick Neil (born October 21, 1973) is a former American college and professional football player who was an offensive lineman in the National Football League (NFL) for eight seasons. He played college football for the University of Texas, and earned All-American honors. He was drafted by the Denver Broncos in the third round of the 1997 NFL Draft, and played for the Broncos during his entire pro football career. Neil was a candidate for the Texas House of Representatives in the 2010 general election.

Early years
Neil was born in Houston, Texas. He attended Cypress Creek High School in suburban Houston, where he played high school football for the Cypress Creek Cougars.

College career
He accepted an athletic scholarship to attend the University of Texas at Austin, and played for the Texas Longhorns football team from 1993 to 1996. As a senior in 1996, he was recognized as a consensus first-team All-American.

Professional career
After seeing limited playing time as a rookie in 1997, he became a reliable starter on the Broncos' offensive line, starting in 104 of 108 games over the next seven seasons. He played on the Broncos' NFL championship teams in Super Bowl XXXII and XXXIII.

Life after football
In 2010, Neil was the Republican nominee for the 48th District of the Texas House of Representatives. His opponents were Democratic incumbent Donna Howard and Libertarian Ben Easton. The election returns showed Howard winning by 16 votes. Neil challenged the results in the Texas House. A select investigating committee found that although Howard had actually won by only four votes, Neil had not met the burden of proof required to overturn the election. Neil dropped the challenge on March 18, 2011, nearly halfway into the legislative session.

Prior to pursuing political aspirations, Neil co-hosted The Morning Rush with Erin Hogan on the Austin area ESPN Radio affiliate 104.9 The Horn.

Neil's son David played varsity football at Westlake High School in West Lake Hills, Texas, from 2015 into the 2018–2019 season.

References

External links
Club bio

1973 births
Living people
All-American college football players
American football offensive guards
Denver Broncos players
Players of American football from Houston
Texas Longhorns football players
Ed Block Courage Award recipients